The Soni are a Hindu and Sikh artisan caste found throughout India in the states of Punjab, Rajasthan and Gujarat. They are traditionally Goldsmiths and Khatris (Kshatriyas). They commonly use the surnames, Pala, Lodhia, Raninga, Khera, Changhada, Hanj, Didani, Rathigara, Dholakia, Chedia, Kadecha, Solanki and Srimali.

Present circumstances 
The Soni are essentially still goldsmiths, with a few also involved in the manufacture of other items of jewellery. Like similar Hindu castes, they are endogamous and maintain a system of clan (gotra) exogamy. The various sub-divisions of the Soni have their own caste associations, such as the Patni Soni Mandal and Shrimali Soni Mandal. They follow Vaishnavism, and many belonging to the Swaminarayan sect. The community primarily speaks Gujarati.

Shrimali Soni 
This caste mostly situated in western India (Gujarat, Maharashtra, Rajasthan) and most state consider Shrimali Soni in General category and normal Soni as OBC.

See also 
Sunar

References 

Social groups of Punjab, India
Social groups of Rajasthan
Social groups of Gujarat
Indian castes
Hindu communities